Hajjiabad-e Salar (also Romanized as Ḩājjīābād-e Sālār; also known as Ḩājjīābād) is a village in Behnamvasat-e Jonubi Rural District, Javadabad District, Varamin County, Tehran Province, Iran. At the 2006 census, its population was 68, in 17 families.

References 

Populated places in Varamin County